Spotlight on Film was a Canadian film informational television series which aired on CBC Television in 1969.

Premise
This series provided an overview of the works of various filmmakers such as Michelangelo Antonioni, Shirley Clarke, Roman Polanski, Alain Resnais, John Schlesinger, Jiri Trnka, Peter Weiss and Mai Zetterling.

Scheduling
This 15-minute series was broadcast Sundays at 1:00 p.m. (Eastern time) from 5 October to 28 December 1969.

External links
 

CBC Television original programming
1969 Canadian television series debuts
1969 Canadian television series endings